Falkland Ridge is a community in the Canadian province of Nova Scotia, located in Annapolis County.

The community is likely named for Lucius Cary, 10th Viscount Falkland, Governor of Nova Scotia from 1840 to 1846 or his wife Amelia Cary, Viscountess Falkland.

References

Communities in Annapolis County, Nova Scotia
General Service Areas in Nova Scotia